The Paulist Fathers, officially named the Missionary Society of Saint Paul the Apostle, abbreviated CSP, is a Catholic society of apostolic life of Pontifical Right for men founded in New York City in 1858 by Isaac Hecker in collaboration with George Deshon, Augustine Hewit, and Francis A. Baker.

The society's mission is to evangelize—preach the gospel or give information with the intention of converting people to Catholicism—the people of North America in a manner suited to the continent's culture.

History

Hecker and the early years 

Isaac Hecker was a priest of the Congregation of the Most Holy Redeemer (Redemptorists), as were all the founding members of the Paulists. Following their conversion to Catholicism, they wanted to create an institute of priests that could evangelize the people of North America in ways that would be more effective than previous methods. Hecker advocated using the popular means of his day, primarily preaching, the public lecture circuit, and the printing press.

Meanwhile, a misunderstanding had arisen between the American Redemptorists and their superiors. In order to seek a final and authoritative settlement of the difficulty, Hecker went to Rome as the representative of the American Fathers, to lay their case before the superior general of the order. Upon his arrival, he found the general and his council extremely hostile, and on the third day he was expelled from the order.

Hecker was supported by Redemptorist Fathers George Deshon, Augustine Hewit, Francis Baker, and Clarence Walworth, who were themselves converts to Catholicism from the Episcopal Church and were influenced significantly by the Oxford Movement. Hecker and his companions were soon after dispensed from their Redemptorist vows and were granted permission to found the Paulist Fathers in 1858 as the Missionary Priests of Saint Paul the Apostle, in honor of Paul of Tarsus, by Pope Pius IX.

Hecker received letters from the Propaganda Fide, strongly recommending him and his associates to the bishops of the United States. The Paulists got their start in the Archdiocese of New York, establishing their headquarters in a parish on 59th Street appropriately named Church of St. Paul the Apostle, granted them by John Hughes. Hecker conceived the Paulists to be a small community with a specific missionary focus. From their headquarters in New York City, they began their task of performing missionary work to non-Catholics. With the outbreak of the American Civil War the northern-based Paulists were compelled to cancel their southern missions.

Archbishop Hughes appealed to West Point graduate George Deshon to serve as a chaplain to a New York Brigade, but given that the Paulists were a newly created community and were so few in number, Deshon declined. During the New York Draft Riots of 1863 the Paulists attempted to dissuade people from violence, but only marginally succeed as efforts were hampered when Father Augustine Hewit was wounded in such an effort.

In 1865 Hecker started the "Catholic World" magazine, then the only Catholic monthly in the country. In 1866, the Catholic Publication Society was created, adding the written word to the Paulist mission. In 1870, a magazine for Catholic youth, The Young Catholic, was also created.

In 1875, the first Paulist missionaries set sail for California; other missions quickly followed in Chicago, Illinois; Winchester, Tennessee; and Austin, Texas. and in Rhode Island, Kentucky, Michigan, and as far north as Quebec. In 1925, they established WLWL, their own radio station in New York. Around 1935, the Paulists outfitted motor trailers as chapels and began a series of missions to rural areas such in states such as South Carolina, Tennessee and Utah.

Modern era 

The Paulist Fathers work as missionaries in the United States. The society created the Paulist associate program for lay people who wish to associate themselves with the Paulists. The Paulists are a society of apostolic life, meaning they do not make religious vows; rather, by means of promises they are supposed to pursue their mission through living in community.

The Paulist Press, based in Mahwah, New Jersey, is a well-established publisher of hardcover and paperback books, audio and visual tapes, DVDs, and educational materials and resources for parishes. It publishes the "Classics of Western Spirituality" series. Paulist Press also maintains an online journal, founded by Isaac Hecker, called The Catholic World, which is a collection of articles on faith and culture.

In addition to serving as parish priests, the Paulists continue evangelization by means of the Paulist National Catholic Evangelization Association, National Offices, publishing and film companies as well as Paulist Mission Preachers.  the society had 20 priests listed as available for missions. The form the missions take is largely dependent on which Paulist is giving it; the Paulists emphasize individuality, and each Paulist presents his message in his own way. The Paulists have also relatively recently created National Offices to head up some of their more important ministries.

The Paulist Office for Reconciliation is a ministry for Catholics who feel alienated or outside of the community. The office seeks to create processes, resource materials, forums, and leaders to recruit these people into the Church.

The Paulist National Office of Ecumenism and Interfaith Relations has the mission of fostering understanding, respect, and collaboration with members of other religions. The office was initially created as a means of updating and educating Paulists in these two fields as to how to go about integrating initiatives locally, but later adopted the additional role of offering consultative visits at campuses, parishes, retreats, and conferences. The office also maintains a newsletter and provides articles and resources for online ministries.

The Paulist Office for Young Adult Ministries is intended to connect young adults to faith communities. The office seeks to promote youth integration and leadership amongst Christian communities, and to see issues and concerns of youth addressed by Church leaders and organizations. This Paulist ministry has many forms such as Busted Halo which is an online spiritual magazine for peoples in their 20s and 30s; the Busted Halo Show, with Father Dave Dwyer, was picked up by the Catholic Channel on Sirius Satellite Radio. The office also hosts young adult retreats and, on occasion, hosts forums and gives presentations. Paulists also have a number of Newman Centers and campus ministries at several major universities throughout the United States; they consider this one of their highest priorities.

Paulist Productions was founded by Ellwood Kieser in California around 1960. It today creates films and television programs on a variety of subjects with spiritual concerns and matters at the heart of the production. Paulist Productions has received a number of awards and continues to develop and produce an assortment of films and series. It has produced Romero, Entertaining Angels: The Dorothy Day Story, and The Twelve Apostles.

In the early 1870s, the Paulist Fathers became the owners of a large portion of lakefront property at the southern end of Lake George in the Adirondacks in upstate New York. St. Mary’s of the Lake serves as a summer retreat and site of the summer component of Paulist student formation. The facilities are available for groups, retreats, meetings, and other gatherings.

Mission 

The Paulist Fathers were the first religious community of priests (as distinct from other religious communities) founded in North America. The Paulists additionally have ministries of ecumenism, interfaith relations, and reconciliation. The Paulists seek to be a bridge between contemporary culture and Catholicism, using media to accomplish this, beginning with the founding of Catholic World magazine in 1865, and continuing with the Paulist Press and its ministries in radio, film, and on the Internet.

Because the Paulist Fathers' primary mission has been the conversion of the American people and society, almost all of its foundations (as Paulist centers of ministry are called) and priests are located in the US. There are Paulist Foundations in 11 US states and Washington, DC. They also serve the American Catholic community in Rome at San Patrizio (which replaced a former foundation at Santa Susanna in August 2017), and, until June 2015, maintained foundations in Toronto.

Leadership
The President, Vice-President, and Council of the Paulist Fathers are elected to four-year terms; in addition, a First Consultor is appointed by the President. Eric Andrews succeeded Michael McGarry as president in May 2014.

Formation

Training to become a Paulist priest is similar to religious institutes. The society is open to single Catholic men with an undergraduate degree that are in good standing with the Church. Training consists of three phases that takes usually 6 years to complete. The first phase is a year-long novitiate, designed to introduce the individual to Paulist life and to help them decide if the Paulist life is for them. The next phase consists of two years of philosophical and theological studies, followed by a one-year apostolate at a Paulist Foundation. On return from his apostolate, he returns to school for two more years and, if successful, will be awarded a Master of Divinity degree. The Paulist Seminary and Novitiate is located at St. Paul's College in Washington, DC, and in recent years Paulist students had a choice of attending either the Catholic University of America or the Washington Theological Union (now closed). Near the end of his studies, the society then decides whether he will proceed to ordination to the diaconate. Once a Deacon, the last phase of formation is a year-long pastoral internship, at the end of which the individual is ordained a priest.

Patrons

Patron saints of the Paulist Fathers include the Virgin Mary, Paul the Apostle, Saint Joseph, Alphonsus Liguori, Francis de Sales, Thomas Aquinas, Saint Patrick, Philip Neri, Teresa of Avila, John of the Cross, Mary Magdalene, and Elizabeth Seton.

Paulist ministries

See also

Catholic World
Institute of consecrated life
Orestes Brownson
Religious institute (Catholic)
Secular institute
Vocational Discernment in the Catholic Church
Order of Saint Paul the First Hermit

References

Footnotes

Bibliography

Hecker: A Missionary to North America. The Paulist Fathers, 997 Macarthur Boulevard, Mahwah, N.J. 07430
What Makes the Paulists Different? Vocations Office, the Paulist Fathers, 415 West 59th Street, New York, New York, 10019
 Paulists and the Civil War, Paulist Office for History and Archives, North American Paulist Center, 3015 4th NE, Washington, DC, 20017
On the Road: The History of Paulist Missions, Father John E. Lynch, C.S.P., Paulist Office for History and Archives, North American Paulist Center, 3015 4th NE, Washington, DC, 20017
Isaac Hecker: An American Catholic.  By David J. O'Brien.  New York: Paulist Press, 1992.
Isaac Hecker and his Friends.  By Joseph McSorley.  New York: Paulist Press, 1972.

External links 

 
Paulist Productions
Paulist Press
Paulist National Catholic Evangelization Association
Bustedhalo

1858 establishments in New York (state)
1858 in North America
 
Catholic orders and societies
Societies of apostolic life